Vysokyi Zamok may refer to:
 Lviv High Castle, a historic castle in Lviv, Ukraine.
 Vysoky Zamok (newspaper), a daily political newspaper in Ukraine.
 Numerous products (mainly alcoholic) named for the High Castle in Lviv.